The University of Puerto Rico, Mayagüez Campus (UPRM) or Recinto Universitario de Mayagüez (RUM)'s annual commencement exercises are held each mid-June, currently in the Rafael A. Mangual Coliseum. The exercises award undergraduate and graduate degrees.

Traditions

Animal Encounters 
During the 104th Commencement, an agricultural sciences student brought one of his pet chickens, named Lencha, with him up to the stage to collect his degree.

After the 106th Commencement, a student had her diploma cover bitten by the campus mascot dog, Tarzán, when posing with him for a photo.

Posthumous Degrees 
In the event of a student's death before completing their degree, it is customary to present their closest of kin with the degree and a green toga.

Past Ceremonies 

* The 99th Commencement was postponed to 10-10-2010 due to the 2010–2011 University of Puerto Rico strikes.

† The 103rd Commencement was the first one to be held in January and had only an afternoon session.

‡ The 104th Commencement was cancelled in 8 May, however it was held a month later due to the 2017 University of Puerto Rico strikes.

§ The 107th Commencement was postponed from 11 June due to the 2020 COVID-19 crisis.

| Reserved footnote.

¶ Reserved footnote.

References 

Ξ
Graduation